Samson Adjei Adjetey (born 9 June 1999) is a Ghanaian professional footballer who plays as midfielder for Ghanaian Premier League side Bechem United F.C.

Career 
Adjetey started his career with Bechem United. In 2019–20 season, he was promoted to the senior squad and made his professional debut on 4 January 2020, after coming on at half time for Richard Twumasi in a 2–1 away loss to International Allies. After impressing during his debut, he was named on the starting line up and played the full 90 minutes in a 1–0 win over Accra Great Olympics the following weekend. He played in 7 league matches before the league was halted and truncated to the outbreak of the COVID-19 in Ghana.

In November 2020, with the league set to restart, he was named on the squad for the 2020–21 season. On 4 April 2021, he played his first match of the season after playing the full 90 minutes in a 2–0 victory over Liberty Professionals. He scored his debut goal on 18 April 2021, scoring in the 43rd minute of a 4–0 victory over Aduana Stars.

References

External links 

 

Living people
1999 births
Association football midfielders
Ghanaian footballers
Bechem United F.C. players
Ghana Premier League players